Minuscule 357 (in the Gregory-Aland numbering), A135 (Soden), is a Greek minuscule manuscript of the New Testament, on parchment. Palaeographically it has been assigned to the 11th century. 
It has marginalia.

Description 

The codex contains the text of the Gospel of Luke and Gospel of John on 281 parchment leaves with catena. The text is written in one column per page, in 35 lines per page.

Text 

The Greek text of the codex is a representative of the Byzantine text-type. Aland placed it in Category V.

It was not examined by using the Claremont Profile Method.

History 

The manuscript once belonged to Cardinal Bessarion (as codices 205, 354). In 1722 it was in the hands of Hieronymus Venerius. The manuscript was added to the list of New Testament manuscripts by Scholz (1794-1852). 
It was examined by Burgon. C. R. Gregory saw it in 1886.

The manuscript is currently housed at the Biblioteca Marciana (Gr. Z. 28) in Venice.

See also 

 List of New Testament minuscules
 Biblical manuscript
 Textual criticism

References

Further reading 

 

Greek New Testament minuscules
11th-century biblical manuscripts